4U 0614+091 is a low-mass X-ray binary star system which features a neutron star and a low-mass companion star. The binary system lies 10,000 light-years away in Orion. It produces jets like a microquasar, the first time an object other than a black hole has been shown to produce jets.

References

External links
 Astrophysicists Discover Compact Jets From Neutron Star – Space Daily
 Surprising Activity from a Dead Star – Space.com
 V1055 Ori

Neutron stars
X-ray binaries
Orion (constellation)
Orionis, V1055